Originally called the Commercial Railway, the London and Blackwall Railway (L&BR) in east London, England, ran from Minories to Blackwall via Stepney, with a branch line to the Isle of Dogs, connecting central London to many of London's docks. It was operational from 1840 until 1926 (for passengers) and 1968 (for goods), closing after the decline of inner London's docks. Much of its infrastructure was reused as part of the Docklands Light Railway. The L&BR was leased by the Great Eastern Railway in 1866, but remained independent until absorbed into the London and North Eastern Railway at the 1923 Grouping. Another branch was opened in 1871, the Millwall Extension Railway.

History
 
It was authorised by an Act of Parliament entitled An Act for making a Railway from the Minories to Blackwall, with Branches, to be called "The Commercial Railway" dated 28 July 1836 in the reign of William IV. The length of the railway was to be .

The engineer of the line was intended to be John Rennie, but the project's City financiers favoured Robert Stephenson, believing that they would also benefit from the knowledge and wisdom of his respected father George.
he was free to choose his own method of propulsion. Drawing on his experience with the Camden Incline on the London and Birmingham Railway he decided upon cable haulage from stationary steam engines.

The railway was on brick arches as far as the West India Docks, and then on an embankment before entering a shallow cutting near the Blackwall terminus at Brunswick Wharf. The station there had an iron-roofed shed, and  offices designed in an Italianate style by William Tite.

The line opened on 6 July 1840, and the company changed its name to the London and Blackwall Railway on completion of an extension to Fenchurch Street, just within the City boundary, in 1841. Agreement between the L&BR and the ECR about operation of the services over the LBER could not be reached so the actual junction was not completed. An interchange station called Victoria Park and Bow was opened but the ECR stopped few services there so most services terminated at Bromley and Bow. Services were withdrawn from Victoria Park and Bow  on 6 January 1851.

By 1854 relations between the two companies had improved and the junction between the two lines was built and the LBER became part of the initial London Tilbury and Southend (LTSR) route to Fenchurch Street and the ECR started operating trains from Loughton into Fenchurch Street.

The LBER  was joined to the new London, Tilbury and Southend Railway direct line from Barking at Gas Factory Junction in 1858.

In 1852 the North London Railway had linked up with the L&BR at Poplar, and Fenchurch Street became the terminus for that line until Broad Street opened in 1865. In 1871 another branch line, the Millwall Extension Railway, opened from Millwall Junction to Millwall Docks to serve the West India Docks better. A year later the line was extended to North Greenwich, near the site of the original Island Gardens DLR station.

Withdrawal of services
In 1893 the Fenchurch Street–Stepney line was widened to four tracks, but by the turn of the century traffic to Blackwall and the Isle of Dogs was dropping. As an economy, railmotors acquired from the Great Western Railway were introduced in 1922 but nonetheless passenger services east of Stepney to North Greenwich and Blackwall were withdrawn on 3 May 1926 as a result of competition from trams.

John Betjeman (1906–1984), in his book First and Last Loves (published 1952), wrote of a journey on the L&BR (most likely in the years just before closure):
Those frequent and quite empty trains of the Blackwall Railway ran from a special platform at Fenchurch Street. I remember them. Like stagecoaches they rumbled past East End chimney pots, wharves and shipping stopping at empty black stations till they came to a final halt at Blackwall station...When one emerged there, there was nothing to see beyond it but a cobbled quay and a vast stretch of wind whipped water...

The minor stations at Leman Street and Shadwell were closed in 1941 as wartime economy measures (as was Burdett Road opened on the Bow extension route in 1871). The junction at Stepney was disconnected in 1951, so that the only remaining access to the Blackwall Branch was from the LBER via the Limehouse Curve, and this was abandoned in 1963 (last train ran 5 November 1962). Access for occasional goods services to Blackwall and North Greenwich via the North London Railway at Poplar continued until 1968, but with the closure of the docks the line was abandoned, leaving only the Fenchurch Street–Stepney section of the original Blackwall branch still in use.

When the Docklands Light Railway opened in 1987, it reused much of the L&BR line between Minories (renamed Tower Gateway) and Westferry Road.

Cable haulage

At the opening only one track was complete and the other was not brought into use until one month later. Each track had a double length of hemp rope, as an engine was winding in from one end an equivalent length of rope was being paid out at the other. Fourteen miles of rope, with metal swivels inserted at intervals to resist entanglements, were therefore required. On journeys from the terminus cars were dispatched in two groups: the first group of four cars for the three most distant stations (the terminus stations, as the most important, received two cars per trip) and the second group destined for the three nearest. Each rearmost car was released ("slipped")  as the convoy passed through its destination station. When the extension to Fenchurch Street was brought into use the pair of cars for that station was slipped from the rope at Minories as before, but the brakes were not applied. Momentum carried them up the slight slope to the new platforms. "Slipping" and "pinning" (attaching) was controlled from an open platform at whichever end of a car was leading, using levers connected to iron grips (acting vertically against blocks beneath the carriage floor). First and second class accommodation was provided; seats were not thought necessary in second class because of the short journey times.

It was obviously dangerous to use the reverse method to pick up cars on journeys to the terminus, so all the cars were "pinned" to the cable at their respective stations and started simultaneously with the convoy departing from the terminus, the timing coordinated by an early example of the Cooke and Wheatstone telegraph. They arrived at the terminus at intervals and a new train gradually assembled itself, with the pair of cars from the far terminus becoming the lead pair for the return trip. The timetable was very simple: a train every 15 minutes.

Power was provided by eight marine steam engines from Maudslay, Sons and Field, providing for four in use and four in maintenance.

The line was converted to use steam locomotives in 1848, partly because wear on the rope proved greater than anticipated (a steel-wire replacement had been tried but this twisted and kinked ferociously) and partly in consequence of the intended 1849 extensions. A light roof over the line was provided where it passed near to timber stores or shipping, because of the anticipated fire risk from locomotive sparks. It then became possible to travel directly between intermediate stations, without a detour by way of a terminus.

Stations
The stations were:

{| class="wikitable"
! Station || Opened || Closed || Notes
|-
|Fenchurch Street || 1854 ||  || 
|-
|Minories (resited) || 1841 || 1853 ||
|-
|Minories (original) || 1840 || 1841 || Site used for Tower Gateway in 1987
|-
|Leman Street || 1877 || 1941 ||
|-
|Cannon Street Road || 1842 || 1848 ||
|-
|Shadwell || 1840 || 1941 ||
|-
|Stepney || 1840 ||  || 1923 renamed Stepney East, 1987 renamed Limehouse 
|-
|Limehouse || 1840 || 1926 || not to be confused with the above
|-
|West India Docks || 1840 || 1926 ||
|-
|Millwall Junction  || 1871 || 1926 ||
|-
|Poplar || 1840 || 1926 ||on a different site to Poplar DLR station
|-
|Blackwall || 1840 || 1926 ||on a different site to Blackwall DLR station
|}

Branch to Bow from Stepney, called the London and Blackwall Extension Railway (opened 1849, joint-operated with the Eastern Counties Railway):

Burdett Road (opened 1871, closed 1941)
 Bromley and Bow (1849–1850)
Bow Road first station (1876–1892) then closed and replaced by second station to provide interchange with Bow (North London Railway station) and on site of original Bromley and Bow station (opened 1892, closed 1949)
Victoria Park & Bow (opened 1849, closed 1850, interchange with Eastern Counties Railway - not to be confused with Victoria Park or Bow stations)

Branch to North Greenwich from Millwall Junction, called the Millwall Extension Railway:

South Dock (opened 1871, closed 1926)
Millwall Docks (opened 1871, closed 1926)
North Greenwich (opened 1871, closed 1926; not to be confused with North Greenwich Underground station)

Notes

References

Bibliography

Further reading

 
Early British railway companies
Transport in the London Borough of Tower Hamlets
Railway companies established in 1836
Railway lines opened in 1841
Closed railway lines in London
History of rail transport in London
1836 establishments in England
London and North Eastern Railway constituents